Corunna Downs Station is a pastoral lease that was once a sheep station but now operates as a cattle station in Western Australia.

Several watercourses run through the property, including Coongan River, Emu, Sandy, and Badgeyong Creeks, which also contain several permanent pools of water. The landscape is mostly flat spinifex country.

The lease was first taken up by John Withnell and William McLean in July 1886. The Mackay brothers, along with Donald and Roderick Louden, took up a holding in 1887. The Mackays' lease consisted of three parcels of  each. In 1890, George Dudley and Alfred Howden Drake-Brockman took up land on what is now Mount Edgar Station. Howden selected the Corunna Downs land and named it after the Battle of Corunna. The leases of the Withnells and Mackays were registered to Dalgety & Company and worked by the Brockman brothers.

In 1916 the property produced over 147 bales of wool, and 105 were produced in 1920.

The  property was made up of 13 separate leases that were combined into a single lease in 1924 when it was acquired by Ernest Samuel Foulkes-Taylor. Taylor had previously held Glenorn Station, near Malcolm, with his younger brother Charlie. In 1924 Corunna Downs was still a fully operational sheep station carrying 20,000 head of sheep, 350 cattle, 125 horses, 175 donkeys and 8 camels.

In 1942 the Royal Australian Air Force built a secret airbase on the station, adjacent to the 1891 homestead. Two bitumen runways of over 1,500 m and 2,000 m were constructed, for use by long-range B-24 Liberator bombers.

The property features in Sally Morgan's book My Place, as her grandmother Daisy was born there.

Heritage significance 
The Heritage Council of Western Australia has listed the Corunna Downs Station and Former Wartime Airbase as culturally significant sites.

See also
List of ranches and stations
List of pastoral leases in Western Australia

References

Pastoral leases in Western Australia
Stations (Australian agriculture)
Homesteads in Western Australia
State Register of Heritage Places in the Shire of East Pilbara